Jannie Milena Salcedo Zambrano (born 14 May 1988) is a Colombian road and track cyclist, who last rode for UCI Women's Team . She represented her nation at the 2015 UCI Track Cycling World Championships.

Major results
2014
2nd Omnium, Central American and Caribbean Games
2015
2nd Omnium, Copa Cuba de Pista
2nd Omnium, Marymoor Grand Prix

References

External links
 profile at Cyclingarchives.com
 

1988 births
Colombian female cyclists
Living people
Cyclists at the 2015 Pan American Games
Cyclists at the 2019 Pan American Games
South American Games gold medalists for Colombia
South American Games silver medalists for Colombia
South American Games medalists in cycling
Competitors at the 2010 South American Games
Pan American Games medalists in cycling
Pan American Games bronze medalists for Colombia
Medalists at the 2019 Pan American Games
Sportspeople from Bogotá
20th-century Colombian women
21st-century Colombian women
Competitors at the 2014 Central American and Caribbean Games
Competitors at the 2018 Central American and Caribbean Games